William Larimer Mellon may refer to: 

William Larimer Mellon Sr. (1868–1949), American businessman and founder of Gulf Oil
William Larimer Mellon Jr. (1910–1989), American philanthropist and physician